Fanling Environmental Resource Centre was a resource center under the management of the Environmental Protection Department of the Government of Hong Kong. It was located in Wo Mun Street, Luen Wo Hui, Fanling, New Territories, Hong Kong.

This was the third Environmental Resource Centre managed by the Environmental Protection Department. It was also the biggest of the three Centres.

There was an exhibition hall, a library, a conference room and a lecture room in the Resource Centre.

Fanling Environmental Resource Centre was closed in 2020.

Exhibition Hall
There were eight display zones in the exhibition. 
Clean Air for You and Me
World of Silence
Reduce Waste, Start from Me
Protect Our Water Resources
Environmental Planning & Assessment
Community Education Interactive Station
Enforcement
Global Environmental Issues

The above display zones were to exhibit the problems and the solution of various kinds of pollutions.

Opening Hours
Closed in 2020.

See also
 Wan Chai Environmental Resource Centre
 Tsuen Wan Environmental Resource Centre

External links
 Fanling Environmental Resource Centre

Museums in Hong Kong
Fanling
Science museums in Hong Kong
Nature centres in Hong Kong